Zakia Bari Mamo is a Bangladeshi model and actress who is best known around the country as Lux Channel I Superstar. After winning the Lux Channel I Superstar beauty pageant in 2006, she got a chance to act in Daruchini Dip. For her role in her debut movie, she received the Bangladesh National Film Awards. After a long break, from her first movie, she acted in the second movie Prem Korbo Tomar Sathe in 2014. Flowing this year, she acted in another movie Chuye Dile Mon with co-actor Arifin Shuvoo.

Early life
Zakia Bari Momo was born on 19 December, in Brahmanbaria, Bangladesh. She passed early life in the home district. At first, Momo dreamed of being a pilot, then an architect, but her early dream halted by media related passion, especially in dancing. She took part in Notun Kuri in 1995, the largest child cultural program in Bangladesh that was aired by Bangladesh Television. Momo won the competition, but she gets countrywide familiarity when she won the Lux Chanel I Award. She becomes first class first in Honors and Masters in Drama and Dramatics from Jahangirnagar University.

Career
Zakia Bari Momo started her career in the silver screen after winning the Lux Chanel I beauty pageant with the movie Daruchini Dip directed by Toukir Ahmed, story by Humayun Ahmed. She showed magnificent performance in the movie with co-actor Riaz and finally got National Award as the best female actress. After a long break, from her first movie, she acted in the second movie Prem Korbo Tomar Sathe in 2014. Following the year, she acted in another blockbuster movie Chuye Dile Mon with co-actor Arefin Shuvo.

Filmography

Television

Web series

Awards 
Daruchini Dip won the National Film Awards total seven categories in the year of 2007.
 Winner Best Actress selected : 'Zakia Bari Momo' 2007
 Winner Best Supporting Actor Female (Bangladesh) for Mohanagar in 2021.

References

Living people
Bengali television actresses
Best Actress National Film Awards (Bangladesh) winners
Bangladeshi film actresses
Bangladeshi television actresses
People from Brahmanbaria district
Best Film Actress Meril-Prothom Alo Award winners
1985 births
Jahangirnagar University alumni
21st-century Bangladeshi actresses